Akhali Kselebi Ltd ( new web), also known as New Net is the third largest telecommunication company of Georgia and Caucasus (After Silknet and MagtiCom). It is a private electronic communications network operator which has business relations with various leading communications companies worldwide. Company was founded on August 2, 1996. It was a new word in electronic communications development and modernization business. The company is under corporate management by the supervisory board and management. More than 700 workers are employed in the company. 

Akhali Kselebi is a member of (T&T Group) consisting of the following companies: 

 System Net Ltd 
 Akhtel Ltd
 Foptnet Ltd
 GTC Ltd
 CGC Ltd
 Iveria Net Ltd
 Sanapiro Ltd

Akhtel (blend of ახალი ("new") and ტელეკომუნიკაციები ("telecommunications")) is one of the companies founded by Akhali Kselebi that successfully operates on the telecommunications market.

External links
AK.ge: official  Akhali Kselebi website—

Telecommunications companies of Georgia (country)
Brands of Georgia (country)
Telecommunications companies established in 1996
1996 establishments in Georgia (country)